Circle in the Round is a 1979 compilation album by jazz musician Miles Davis. It compiled outtakes from sessions across fifteen years of Davis's career that, with one exception, had been previously unreleased. All of its tracks have since been made available on album reissues and posthumous box sets.

Material
"Two Bass Hit" is from a 1955 session. A 1958 re-recording was released on Milestones. "Love for Sale", previously released on a 1974 Japanese compilation, features the same lineup that would play on most of Kind of Blue. "Blues No. 2" comes from the last session that Davis and John Coltrane would record together in 1961, although Coltrane does not play on the track.

The title track, recorded in late 1967, is the first Davis recording to depart from the strictly acoustic quintet, featuring the sound of the electric guitar (played by Joe Beck). This marks the inception of his "electric" period, which would continue in his music throughout the remainder of his career. Edited here by seven minutes, the full track was released on The Complete Studio Recordings of The Miles Davis Quintet 1965–1968. The first officially released Davis track with electric guitar was "Paraphernalia", from 1968's Miles in the Sky, with George Benson contributing. Benson appears here on the second take of "Side Car" and "Sanctuary".

"Teo's Bag", "Side Car" (both takes are released), "Splash", and "Sanctuary" come from two sessions in early 1968. ("Teo's Bag", a Herbie Hancock composition, is also known as "The Collector," and had been previously recorded by Wayne Shorter for Blue Note records.) "Splash" was later released unedited on The Complete In a Silent Way Sessions and the 2002 reissue of Water Babies, while a re-recording of "Sanctuary" in August 1969 would be the closing track on Bitches Brew.

"Guinnevere" is from the same "electric" sessions of early 1970, with sitar and tabla, which yielded "Great Expectations", "Orange Lady" and "Lonely Fire" (released on Big Fun). Like the title track, it was released here in abbreviated form, as on The Complete Bitches Brew Sessions, the track is three minutes longer.

Critical reception 

In Christgau's Record Guide: Rock Albums of the Seventies (1981), Robert Christgau deemed the recordings on Circle in the Round "damaged goods", even though "Miles tastes better out of the can than fresh watermelon or even V.S.O.P." Lester Bangs voted it as one of 1979's ten best records in his ballot for The Village Voices annual Pazz & Jop poll. "Although seemingly hodgepodge in arrangement, Circle in the Round is a brilliant examination of the depth of scope and range possessed by Miles Davis", Lindsay Planer later wrote in AllMusic.

Track listing
All tracks by Miles Davis except where noted

Personnel
Recorded between October 26, 1955 and January 27, 1970.

 Miles Davis — trumpet, bells, chimes
 John Coltrane — tenor saxophone (track 1, 2)
 Cannonball Adderley — alto saxophone (track 2)
 Hank Mobley — tenor saxophone (track 3)
 Wayne Shorter — tenor saxophone (tracks 4-10)
 Bennie Maupin — bass clarinet (track 10)
 Khalil Balakrishna — sitar (track 10)
 Joe Beck — guitar  (track 4)
 George Benson — guitar  (tracks 7,9)
 John McLaughlin — guitar  (track 10)
 Red Garland — piano (track 1)
 Bill Evans — piano (track 2)
 Wynton Kelly — piano  (track 3)
 Herbie Hancock — piano (tracks 4-7, 9), celeste (track 4), electric piano (track 8)
 Chick Corea — electric piano (tracks 8,10)
 Joe Zawinul — electric piano (track 10)
 Paul Chambers — bass (tracks 1-3)
 Ron Carter — bass  (tracks 4-7,9)
 Dave Holland — bass  (track 8,10)
 Philly Joe Jones — drums  (tracks 1,3)
 Jimmy Cobb — drums  (track 2)
 Tony Williams — drums  (tracks 4-9)
 Billy Cobham — drums  (track 10)
 Jack DeJohnette — drums  (track 10)
 Airto Moreira — percussion  (track 10)

References

External links 
 

1979 compilation albums
Miles Davis compilation albums
Columbia Records compilation albums
Legacy Recordings compilation albums
Albums recorded at CBS 30th Street Studio